Rock spider, Rock-Spider, rockspider, or variation, may refer to:

 Rockspider (1999 book) a true crime book by Vikki Petraitis
 Afrikaner (derogatory slang) in South African English, see List of South African slang words
A pedophile or child molester (Australia, slang, prison slang).
 Caladenia petrensis, the rock spider orchid

See also

 Spider Rock, a feature in Canyon de Chelly National Monument
 Rock (disambiguation)
 Spider (disambiguation)

•Hawthorn football Club players including supporters and all known affiliates, as per the Schuters